Harold G. Van Maanen (born July 28, 1928) was an American politician in the state of Iowa.

Van Maanen was born in Oskaloosa, Iowa. He was a farmer. He served in the Iowa House of Representatives from 1979 to 1999 as a Republican.

References

1928 births
Living people
People from Oskaloosa, Iowa
Farmers from Iowa
Republican Party members of the Iowa House of Representatives